Nicholson is a city in Jackson County, Georgia, United States. The population was 1,696 at the 2010 census, up from 1,247 at the 2000 census.

Nicholson is known for its "Daisy Festival" and for several famous residents, including singer Kenny Rogers. Jan Bell Webster is the mayor of Nicholson.

History
The Georgia General Assembly incorporated Nicholson as a town in 1907. It is unknown why the name "Nicholson" was applied to this community.

Geography

Nicholson is located in eastern Jackson County at  (34.114664, -83.429363). U.S. Route 441 runs through the center of the city, leading north  to Commerce and south  to Athens. Georgia State Route 335 leads west from Nicholson  to Jefferson, the county seat.

The city is on the crest of a ridge which drains west and east to tributaries of the North Oconee River.

Demographics

2020 census

As of the 2020 United States census, there were 1,808 people, 523 households, and 413 families residing in the city.

2000 census
As of the census of 2000, there were 1,247 people, 435 households, and 348 families residing in the city. The racial makeup of the city was 93.10% White, 3.69% African American, 0.16% Native American, 0.48% Asian, 1.52% from other races, and 1.04% from two or more races. Hispanic or Latino of any race were 2.25% of the population.

There were 435 households, out of which 42.8% had children under the age of 18 living with them, 64.1% were married couples living together, 11.3% had a female householder with no husband present, and 20.0% were non-families. 14.5% of all households were made up of individuals, and 6.0% had someone living alone who was 65 years of age or older.  The average household size was 2.87 and the average family size was 3.20.

In the city, the population was spread out, with 30.5% under the age of 18, 9.0% from 18 to 24, 33.0% from 25 to 44, 20.7% from 45 to 64, and 6.9% who were 65 years of age or older.  The median age was 32 years. For every 100 females, there were 98.9 males.  For every 100 females age 18 and over, there were 93.5 males.

The median income for a household in the city was $38,977, and the median income for a family was $41,033. Males had a median income of $30,074 versus $23,036 for females. The per capita income for the city was $14,088.  About 7.3% of families and 10.4% of the population were below the poverty line, including 11.5% of those under age 18 and 16.5% of those age 65 or over.

References

External links
  City of Nicholson official website
 Antioch United Methodist Church historical marker

Cities in Georgia (U.S. state)
Cities in Jackson County, Georgia